Macambira is a municipality located in the Brazilian state of Sergipe. Its population was 6,961 (2020) and its area is 137 km².

References

Municipalities in Sergipe